Tantsud tähtedega (Estonian: Dancing with the Stars) is an Estonian television reality show that aired on Kanal 2 and season six on TV3. It debuted on 8 October 2006, and it became a popular television show in Estonia. It is based on the British reality show Strictly Come Dancing. The series was produced by BEC productions and ended in 2011.

The show introduces eight Estonian celebrities paired with professional ballroom dancers who each week compete to impress a panel of judges and the viewing public to survive potential elimination. Through a telephone poll, viewers vote for those couples who should stay. 50% of the public votes and the average score given by the panel of judges go towards deciding who should leave. Proceeds from the voting go to charity.

Six seasons have been produced, in 2006, 2007, 2008, 2010, 2011 and 2022.

Judges
 Merle Klandorf (2006–2011) - former professional ballroom dancer, ballroom dance teacher
 Ants Tael (2006–2010) - ballroom dance teacher
 Jüri Nael (2006–07; 2010–11) - choreographer and dance pedagogue
 Kaie Kõrb (2006–2008) - former ballerina and dance pedagogue
 Riina Suhhotskaja (2008) - aerobics coach
 Märt Agu (2008) - choreographer and dance pedagogue

Seasons

Season one

Season one premiered in October 2006. The hosts were Mart Sander and Kristiina Heinmets-Aigro. The show was won by singer Mikk Saar and his partner Olga Kosmina. The runners-up were singer Gerli Padar and her partner Martin Parmas.

Season two

Season two premiered in October 2007. The hosts were Mart Sander and Merle Liivak. The show was won by singer Koit Toome and his partner Kerttu Tänav. The runners-up were singer Luisa Värk and her partner Martin Parmas.

Season three

Season three premiered in October 2008. The hosts were Mart Sander and a runner-up of the first season Gerli Padar. The show was won by professional bodybuilder Argo Ader and his partner Helena Liiv. The runners-up were singer Maarja-Liis Ilus and her partner .

Season four

Season four premiered in October 2010. The hosts are Mart Sander and Kaisa Oja. The winners were Liina Vahter and Mairold Millert. The runners-up were singer Ithaka Maria Rahula and Marko Kiigajaan.

Season five

Season five premiered in October 2011. The hosts are Mart Sander and Liina Randpere. The winners were actor Jan Uuspõld and his partner Aleksandra Žeregelja. The runners-up were World Figure Skating silver medallist Anna Levandi and her partner Mairold Millert.

External links
 Official website

 
2006 Estonian television series debuts
2000s Estonian television series
2006 in Estonian television
Dance competition television shows
Estonian reality television series
Non-British television series based on British television series
Kanal 2 original programming